"Over" is a song written by Paul Jenkins and David Elliott Johnson and recorded by American country music artist Blake Shelton. It was released in May 2012 as the fourth and final single from Shelton's 2011 album Red River Blue. The song reached number one on the US Billboard Hot Country Songs chart in September 2012. It was originally released in 2007 as a track on Burn Out Bright, the debut and only album released by Jenkins's band, The Royce.

Critical reception
Billy Dukes of Taste of Country gave the song three stars out of five, calling it "an extraordinary recording of an ordinary song." Ashley Cooke of Roughstock gave the song two stars out of five, writing that it "doesn’t really fit [Shelton's] style or personality." Kevin John Coyne of Country Universe gave the song a D grade, calling it "mediocre" and comparing it to a nineties lukewarm rock ballad.

Music video
The music video was directed by Roman White and premiered on June 15, 2012.

Covers 
Terry McDermott covered the song in 3rd season on The Voice.

Chart performance
"Over" debuted at number 53 on the U.S. Billboard Hot Country Songs chart for the week of May 19, 2012. On the chart dated September 1, 2012, "Over" became Shelton's seventh consecutive number one single, and his twelfth overall.

Year-end charts

Certifications

References

2012 singles
2011 songs
Country ballads
2010s ballads
Blake Shelton songs
Song recordings produced by Scott Hendricks
Music videos directed by Roman White
Warner Records Nashville singles
Songs written by Paul Jenkins (songwriter)